Atmospheric science is the study of the Earth's atmosphere and its various inner-working physical processes. Meteorology includes atmospheric chemistry and atmospheric physics with a major focus on weather forecasting. Climatology is the study of atmospheric changes (both long and short-term) that define average climates and their change over time, due to both natural and anthropogenic climate variability. Aeronomy is the study of the upper layers of the atmosphere, where dissociation and ionization are important. Atmospheric science has been extended to the field of planetary science and the study of the atmospheres of the planets and natural satellites of the Solar System.

Experimental instruments used in atmospheric science include satellites, rocketsondes, radiosondes, weather balloons, radars, and lasers.

The term aerology (from Greek ἀήρ, aēr, "air"; and -λογία, -logia) is sometimes used as an alternative term for the study of Earth's atmosphere; in other definitions, aerology is restricted to the free atmosphere, the region above the planetary boundary layer.

Early pioneers in the field include Léon Teisserenc de Bort and Richard Assmann.

Atmospheric chemistry 

Atmospheric chemistry is a branch of atmospheric science in which the chemistry of the Earth's atmosphere and that of other planets is studied. It is a multidisciplinary field of research and draws on environmental chemistry, physics, meteorology, computer modeling, oceanography, geology and volcanology and other disciplines. Research is increasingly connected with other areas of study such as climatology.

The composition and chemistry of the atmosphere is of importance for several reasons, but primarily because of the interactions between the atmosphere and living organisms. The composition of the Earth's atmosphere has been changed by human activity and some of these changes are harmful to human health, crops and ecosystems. Examples of problems which have been addressed by atmospheric chemistry include acid rain, photochemical smog and global warming. Atmospheric chemistry seeks to understand the causes of these problems, and by obtaining a theoretical understanding of them, allow possible solutions to be tested and the effects of changes in government policy evaluated.

Atmospheric dynamics 

Atmospheric dynamics is the study of motion systems of meteorological importance, integrating observations at multiple locations and times and theories. Common topics studied include diverse phenomena such as thunderstorms, tornadoes, gravity waves, tropical cyclones, extratropical cyclones, jet streams, and global-scale circulations. The goal of dynamical studies is to explain the observed circulations on the basis of fundamental principles from physics. The objectives of such studies incorporate improving weather forecasting, developing methods for predicting seasonal and interannual climate fluctuations, and understanding the implications of human-induced perturbations (e.g., increased carbon dioxide concentrations or depletion of the ozone layer) on the global climate.

Atmospheric physics 

Atmospheric physics is the application of physics to the study of the atmosphere. Atmospheric physicists attempt to model Earth's atmosphere and the atmospheres of the other planets using fluid flow equations, chemical models, radiation balancing, and energy transfer processes in the atmosphere and underlying oceans and land. In order to model weather systems, atmospheric physicists employ elements of scattering theory, wave propagation models, cloud physics, statistical mechanics and spatial statistics, each of which incorporate high levels of mathematics and physics. Atmospheric physics has close links to meteorology and climatology and also covers the design and construction of instruments for studying the atmosphere and the interpretation of the data they provide, including remote sensing instruments.

In the United Kingdom, atmospheric studies are underpinned by the Meteorological Office. Divisions of the U.S. National Oceanic and Atmospheric Administration (NOAA) oversee research projects and weather modeling involving atmospheric physics. The U.S. National Astronomy and Ionosphere Center also carries out studies of the high atmosphere.

The Earth's magnetic field and the solar wind interact with the atmosphere, creating the ionosphere, Van Allen radiation belts, telluric currents, and radiant energy.

Climatology 

In contrast to meteorology, which studies short term weather systems lasting up to a few weeks, climatology studies the frequency and trends of those systems. It studies the periodicity of weather events over years to millennia, as well as changes in long-term average weather patterns, in relation to atmospheric conditions. Climatologists, those who practice climatology, study both the nature of climates – local, regional or global – and the natural or human-induced factors that cause climates to change. Climatology considers the past and can help predict future climate change.

Phenomena of climatological interest include the atmospheric boundary layer, circulation patterns, heat transfer (radiative, convective and latent), interactions between the atmosphere and the oceans and land surface (particularly vegetation, land use and topography), and the chemical and physical composition of the atmosphere. Related disciplines include astrophysics, atmospheric physics, chemistry, ecology, physical geography, geology, geophysics, glaciology, hydrology, oceanography, and volcanology.

Aeronomy 

Aeronomy is the scientific study of the upper atmosphere of the Earth — the atmospheric layers above the stratopause — and corresponding regions of the atmospheres of other planets, where the entire atmosphere may correspond to the Earth's upper atmosphere or a portion of it. A branch of both atmospheric chemistry and atmospheric physics, aeronomy contrasts with meteorology, which focuses on the layers of the atmosphere below the stratopause.  In atmospheric regions studied by aeronomers, chemical dissociation and ionization are important phenomena.

Atmospheres on other celestial bodies 

All of the Solar System's planets have atmospheres.  This is because their gravity is strong enough to keep gaseous particles close to the surface.  Larger gas giants are massive enough to keep large amounts of the light gases hydrogen and helium close by, while the smaller planets lose these gases into space. The composition of the Earth's atmosphere is different from the other planets because the various life processes that have transpired on the planet have introduced free molecular oxygen. Much of Mercury's atmosphere has been blasted away by the solar wind. The only moon that has retained a dense atmosphere is Titan. There is a thin atmosphere on Triton, and a trace of an atmosphere on the Moon.

Planetary atmospheres are affected by the varying degrees of energy received from either the Sun or their interiors, leading to the formation of dynamic weather systems such as hurricanes (on Earth), planet-wide dust storms (on Mars), an Earth-sized anticyclone on Jupiter (called the Great Red Spot), and holes in the atmosphere (on Neptune). At least one extrasolar planet, HD 189733 b, has been claimed to possess such a weather system, similar to the Great Red Spot but twice as large.

Hot Jupiters have been shown to be losing their atmospheres into space due to stellar radiation, much like the tails of comets. These planets may have vast differences in temperature between their day and night sides which produce supersonic winds, although the day and night sides of HD 189733b appear to have very similar temperatures, indicating that planet's atmosphere effectively redistributes the star's energy around the planet.

References

External links

Atmospheric fluid dynamics applied to weather maps – Principles such as Advection, Deformation and Vorticity
National Center for Atmospheric Research (NCAR) Archives, documents the history of the atmospheric sciences

 
Fluid dynamics